Baba Pashman (also Romanized as Bābā Pashmān, Bābā Pashīmān, and Bāba Poshmān) is a village in Chalanchulan Rural District, Silakhor District, Dorud County, Lorestan Province, Iran. At the 2006 census, its population was 228, in 61 families.

References 

Towns and villages in Dorud County